Association Sportive de Monaco Football Club SA, commonly referred to as AS Monaco, ASM or Monaco, is a Monégasque professional football club based in Fontvieille, Monaco. Although not in France, it is a member of the French Football Federation (FFF) and currently competes in Ligue 1, the top tier of French football. Founded in 1918, the team plays its home matches at the Stade Louis II.
Its training center is situated in neighboring France, in la Turbie.

Despite not being a French club, Monaco is one of the most successful clubs in French football, having won eight league titles, five Coupe de France trophies and one Coupe de la Ligue. The club is among the best in European football, and were runners-up in the UEFA Cup Winners' Cup in 1992 and the UEFA Champions League in 2004.

The club's traditional colours are red and white, and the club is known as Les Rouge et Blanc (The Red and Whites). Monaco is a member of the European Club Association. In December 2011, two-thirds of the club was sold to an investment group led by Russian oligarch and billionaire Dmitry Rybolovlev. With Rybolovlev's financial backing, the club quickly returned to Ligue 1 and won the 2016–17 Ligue 1, their first league title in 17 years.

Status 
Unlike several other European microstates, Monaco has never organized a domestic league and has never sought separate membership in either UEFA or FIFA. As a result, AS Monaco has no domestic league to play in its home country, resulting in it being expatriated into the French league system. AS Monaco is a full member of said French league pyramid, enabling it to represent France in European competitions. There are several other expatriated football clubs in operation around Europe, although AS Monaco is unique in that it represents a nation not a member of the international organizations. Although Vaduz among other Liechtenstein clubs play in the Swiss league system due to Liechtenstein not having a league, those clubs do have a domestic cup in their home country and qualify for European football that way. Two other microstates in Europe have or had teams playing abroad, Andorra and San Marino, although those clubs are separate from existing domestic league infrastructures.

History

Early history
AS Monaco FC was founded on 1 August 1919 as a unification of numerous local clubs based in France and the principality. Then, the multiple sports club of the Association Sportive de Monaco was founded on 23 August 1924. AS Monaco FC was then absorbed by the latter and became the football section of the enlarged Monegasque sporting club.

The club's early years were spent in the amateur regional divisions of the Provence-Alpes-Côte d'Azur region, rising rapidly between the leagues in the 1920s. In 1933, Monaco were invited by the French Football Federation to turn professional. The Monégasques' first year of second division football ended in failure, however, as they were relegated to the amateur leagues the following year. By 1948, Monaco re-acquired its professional status and returned to the French second division; they subsequently consistently finished in its upper echelons, with this sustained effort resulting in promotion to the French first division for the first time in 1953.

1960–1986: Domestic successes

In 1960, Monaco coach Lucien Leduc led the club to its first professional trophy, the Coupe de France, beating Saint-Étienne 4–2 in extra time. This initial success was bettered in the following year with the club winning the French Championship for the first time in its history, qualifying for the European Cup. Leduc subsequently led the club to its first League and Cup Double in 1963. Upon Leduc's departure in 1963, Monaco endured a barren run, entrenched in the middle half of the league for the best part of the next decade and alternating between the first and second divisions after 1963. In 1975, Jean-Louis Campora, son of former president Charles Campora, became chairman of the club. In his second season, he brought back Leduc, who immediately won the club promotion to the first division and won them the championship the following year in 1978. Leduc subsequently left the club again in 1979, to be succeeded by Lucien Muller and Gérard Banide, both of whom were unable to halt the club's decline.

The early 1980s saw a steady stream of successes in national competitions. Monaco won a title almost every other year; the Coupe de France in 1980 and 1985, the French Championship in 1982, was Coupe de France finalist in 1984. In the 1985–86 season, Monaco hammered Bordeaux 9–0, one of the biggest wins in club history.

Disappointingly for Monaco fans, the club could not translate its domestic leadership into European success. Up to this point, Monaco had never passed the first round of any European competition. Monaco lost to Dundee United (1981), CSKA Sofia twice (1982 and 1984) and Universitatea Craiova (1985).

1990s: Wenger and Tigana

In 1986, former Ajax manager Ștefan Kovács, who succeeded Rinus Michels and honed his Total Football ideals with the Dutch champions, came out of a three-year "retirement" to manage Monaco, but even he could not bring them success. With the club facing a second barren spell, they signed Arsène Wenger, who had hitherto been relatively unknown, managing Nancy without much success. Wenger's reign saw the club enjoy one of its most successful periods, with several inspired signings, including George Weah, Glenn Hoddle, Jürgen Klinsmann, and Youri Djorkaeff. Youth team policies produced future World Cup winners Emmanuel Petit, Lilian Thuram and Thierry Henry. Under Wenger, they won the league in his first season in charge (1988) and the Coupe de France in 1991, with the club consistently competing in the latter stages of the European Cup and regularly challenging for the league title. The club could have had even greater success in this period, as it emerged in 1993 that bitter rivals Marseille had indulged in match fixing and numerous improprieties, a view that Wenger had long held. In 1994, after being blocked by the Monaco board from opening discussions with German powerhouse Bayern Munich for their vacant managerial post after being shortlisted for the role, Wenger was released from the club, several weeks after the post had already been filled.

After Wenger's departure, the club went on to record two further league championships; under Jean Tigana in 1997 and under Claude Puel in 2000. However, as the decade came to an end, rumours were surfacing that the club was facing numerous financial difficulties. In 2003, these financial problems came to a head. Despite finishing second in the league, the club was relegated to Ligue 2 by the French Professional League for amassing a €50 million ($68 million) debt. Whilst this was reduced on appeal to a ban on purchasing players, it was enough to force President Jean-Louis Campora, who had been in charge for 28 years, to step aside. He was replaced by Pierre Svara, an administrator considered to be close to the principality's princely family but with no footballing experience.

The following season saw remarkable success on the field, given the club's financial strife. The team, coached by former France/ national team captain Didier Deschamps and featuring stalwarts such as Fernando Morientes, Ludovic Giuly, Jérôme Rothen and Dado Pršo, finished third in Ligue 1 and enjoyed a remarkable run to the final of the UEFA Champions League, beating Real Madrid and Chelsea along the way. However, despite the on-field success, the 2003–04 season was the club's worst financial year in its history. Within 12 months, Deschamps had left as coach and Svara had been replaced by Michel Pastor.

Relegation and takeover 

With Francesco Guidolin hired to replace Deschamps, one of Pastor's first tasks was to hold on to the players who had turned the club into one of the best in Europe. However, he failed to convince them to stay and their replacements were unable to replicate previous successes. Guidolin lasted only one year, before being replaced by assistant coach Laurent Banide who, in turn, only lasted a year, before being replaced by Brazilian Ricardo Gomes. In 2008, after four years at the club featuring six coaches and only mid-table finishes, Pastor left the club amid severe criticism of his management skills.

In 2008, Jérôme de Bontin, a leading shareholder of the club since 2003, took charge of the club, promising a complete shake-up. Under his reign as president, the club brought in players such as Park Chu-young and Freddy Adu, but they did not find much success on the pitch, going through a torrid season and only managing a mid-table finish. De Bontin resigned at the end of the season, replaced by banker Étienne Franzi and a new board of directors.

In July 2009, Ricardo Gomes was replaced by former Cannes and Rennes coach Guy Lacombe, inheriting a youthful squad featuring numerous highly lauded youth team prospects, including Cédric Mongongu, Serge Gakpé, Vincent Muratori, Frédéric Nimani, Nicolas N'Koulou, Park Chu-young, Yohan Mollo and Yohann Thuram-Ulien. Lacombe led Monaco to eighth place in Ligue 1 in his first season in charge, but he was unable to replicate this performance in his second season and was sacked in January 2011, with Monaco in 17th place in Ligue 1. He was replaced by former coach Laurent Banide, who was unable to turn around the club's fortunes; Monaco finished the 2010–11 season in 18th, thus becoming relegated to Ligue 2.

In December 2011, 66.67% of the club was sold to the Russian oligarch and billionaire Dmitry Rybolovlev (via a trust under his daughter Ekaterina's name) while the club were bottom of Ligue 2. Banide was sacked due to this poor start to the 2011–12 season, and was replaced by Italian manager Marco Simone. Although he lifted the club to eighth by the end of the season, the club's board targeted promotion for the upcoming season and so fired him and appointed his compatriot Claudio Ranieri, whose attacking style of football saw the club score 64 goals in the 2012–13 season. With the club only losing four times, Monaco finished the season as champions, earning promotion back to Ligue 1. Using Rybolovlev's funds, Monaco were one of the biggest spenders in Europe in 2013, spending roughly £140 million, including a club-record £50 million for Radamel Falcao from Atlético Madrid and £40 million for James Rodríguez from FC Porto. Monaco finished in 2nd place in Ligue 1 in the 2013–14 season and Ranieri was replaced by Leonardo Jardim. The following season, Monaco cut expenses, selling Rodriguez to Real Madrid for €75m and loaning Falcao to Manchester United. Despite the high-profile departures, Monaco finished in 3rd place in Ligue 1 and made it to the quarter-finals of the Champions League, defeating Arsenal in the Round of 16 before exiting at the hands of Juventus. Top-scorer from the 2013–14 season Anthony Martial, who managed 12 goals in all competitions, departing for Manchester United in the summer for a fee of €60m, the highest fee paid for a teenager in football history. This, combined with the sales of Geoffrey Kondogbia, Layvin Kurzawa, Yannick Carrasco, Aymen Abdennour, Lucas Ocampos and other, saw the Monegasque club earn over €180m in the transfer window.

Ligue 1 triumph and aftermath (2016–present) 

Monaco won the Ligue 1 title on 17 May 2017, defeating AS Saint-Étienne 2–0. Radamel Falcao and Kylian Mbappé scored 30 and 26 goals respectively to ensure a first Ligue 1 title in 17 years. Monaco went undefeated for the last 20 games of the season, winning 18 of those 20 games.

In the 2016–17 UEFA Champions League, Monaco staged a comeback in the Round of 16, losing the first leg 5–3 to Manchester City before beating the English side 3–1 at home to win on away goals. Monaco then defeated Borussia Dortmund 6–3 on aggregate before going down 4–1 over two legs to Juventus. In the summer, Kylian Mbappé went to rivals PSG on loan, with obligation to buy for a fee of €180m, making it the second-highest transfer fee in history after Neymar. Teammates Bernardo Silva and Benjamin Mendy were sold to Manchester City for over €100m combined and Tiémoué Bakayoko was sold to Chelsea for €40 million. Monaco managed to finish 2nd in the 2017–18 Ligue 1, 13 points behind league winners PSG. In the summer of 2018, Fabinho was sold to Liverpool for €42 million.

Jardim was replaced as coach by Thierry Henry in October 2018 after a poor start to the season. Henry was suspended from his job in January, and Jardim returned days later. Monaco finished the season in 17th, avoiding relegation playoffs by 2 points. In December 2019 Jardim was fired for the second time in 14 months, and former Spain manager Robert Moreno was appointed in his place.

In 2019–20, the COVID-19 pandemic suspended and then curtailed the football season. Monaco ended the season in 9th. Moreno was sacked in July, and replaced by former Bayern Munich manager Niko Kovač, who finished the following season in third position with 78 points and winning 24 matches from 38 (63%). Kovač left at the start of the year 2022, being replaced by Philippe Clement.

Stadium 

Monaco played at the original Stade Louis II since its construction in 1939. In 1985, the stadium was replaced with the current iteration, built on a nearby site consisting of land reclaimed from the Mediterranean, which has become a recurring feature of the stadium's seaside surroundings. The stadium is named after the former Prince of Monaco Louis II and houses a total of 18,523 supporters. The Stade Louis II is noted for its iconic nine arches and has hosted numerous athletic events and European Cup finals. Every August from 1998 to 2012, it hosted each instance of the annual UEFA Super Cup, but from 2013 onward, UEFA decided to rotate the event throughout various stadiums.

Players

Current squad

Out on loan

Reserves

Management and staff 
Senior club staff

Presidential history

Coaching history

Honours

Domestic competitions 

 Ligue 1
 Winners (8): 1960–61, 1962–63, 1977–78, 1981–82, 1987–88, 1996–97, 1999–2000, 2016–17
 Runners-up (7): 1963–64, 1983–84, 1990–91, 1991–92, 2002–03, 2013–14, 2017–18
 Ligue 2
 Winners: 2012–13
 Runners-up (3): 1952–53, 1970–71, 1976–77 
 Championnat de France Amateur
 Winners (3): 1963–64, 1970–71, 2007–08
 Coupe de France
 Winners (5): 1959–60, 1962–63, 1979–80, 1984–85, 1990–91
 Runners-up (5): 1973–74, 1983–84, 1988–89, 2009–10, 2020–21
 Coupe de la Ligue
 Winners: 2002–03
 Runners-up (3): 2000–01, 2016–17, 2017–18
 Trophée des Champions
 Winners (4): 1961, 1985, 1997, 2000
 Runners-up (3): 1960, 2017, 2018
 Coupe Charles Drago
 Winners: 1961

European

European Cup Winners' Cup
Runners-up (1): 1991–92

UEFA Champions League
Runners-up (1): 2003–04

UEFA club coefficient ranking

Records

References

External links 

 

 
Multi-sport clubs in France
Expatriated football clubs
Association football clubs established in 1924
Football in Monaco
Football clubs in Monaco
1924 establishments in Europe
Ligue 1 clubs